Teiko is the common Roman alphabet spelling of two different Japanese given names, one feminine and one masculine; they are spelled differently in Japanese.

The feminine name (ていこ) is spelled Teiko in systemic romanisation. It may be written with a variety of kanji including ; these same characters may also be read as a Korean feminine name, Jeong-ja. People with this name include:
 Teiko Nishi (born c. 1967), an American former women's basketball player
 Teiko Kihira (1928-2015), was a Japanese politician and activist
 Teiko Inahata (1931-2022), was a Japanese haiku poet, essayist and literary critic
 Teiko Tomita (1896-1990), was a Japanese tanka poet

The masculine name (ていこう, spelled Teikō in systemic romanisation, ending in a long vowel) may refer to:
 Teikō Shiotani (1899–1988), a photographer from Tottori, Japan

References

Japanese feminine given names
Japanese masculine given names